The Lost Honour of Katharina Blum, or: How violence develops and where it can lead (German original title: Die Verlorene Ehre der Katharina Blum oder: Wie Gewalt entstehen und wohin sie führen kann) is a 1975 film adaptation of the novel of the same name by Heinrich Böll, written for the screen and directed by Volker Schlöndorff and Margarethe von Trotta. Schlöndorff and von Trotta wrote the script with an emphasis on the vindictive and harsh treatment of an innocent woman by the public, the police and the media. The film stars Angela Winkler as Blum, Mario Adorf as Kommissar Beizmenne, Dieter Laser as Tötges, and Jürgen Prochnow as Ludwig. The film and the novel were also adapted into an American TV film titled The Lost Honor of Kathryn Beck in 1984.

Plot
Katharina Blum is an innocent woman who works as a housekeeper for a famous corporate lawyer, Hubert Blorna, and his wife Trude. She is nicknamed "the Nun" due to her prudish lifestyle which makes her acquaintances very surprised by her suspected involvement with a criminal. Her life is ruined by an invasive tabloid reporter, Werner Tötges, who works for a tabloid simply known as The Paper. Katharina lands in the papers when the police begin to investigate her in connection with Ludwig Götten, a man she has just met and quickly fallen in love with, and who is accused of being an anarchist, a bank robber, and an alleged terrorist. Police suspect Katharina of aiding and abetting Götten.

Katharina meets Werner at a costume party attended by her friend. Her friend is with her boyfriend (a police informant, unknown to the others) who is dressed like a sheikh. He radios back to the police with information regarding Werner's whereabouts and his meeting with Katharina. The police search Katharina's apartment the next day but do not find him there. They take her in for interrogation which makes her very unhappy. They know he could not have gone far since he was in her apartment last night. They lie to her and use cruel investigation tactics to get her to confess his whereabouts but she will not budge.

Throughout the film, Katharina's limits are tested, and her dignity, as well as her sanity, is on the line as she tries her best to make her voice heard and the truth known. Lie after lie is printed by The Paper and everyone, including Katharina's former friends begins to believe it. After Tötges visits Katharina's mother, who is recovering from surgery in the hospital, her mother dies. He fabricates her last words in his newspaper to give the impression to the readers that she despised her daughter with her dying breath. This aggravates Katharina greatly. Ludwig is captured; Katharina had allowed him to hide out at the country house of Alois Sträubleder, a political leader who was pursuing her romantically and had given her the key to his country villa. The police had earlier taken an expensive ring from her as evidence that she was in contact with the bank robber but it is revealed it was in fact Alois's private gift to her. It turns out that Ludwig was not a bank robber but instead a deserter from the Bundeswehr who stole two regiments' pay.

Unable to find justice for herself or make the negative press coverage stop, Katharina murders Tötges and his photographer. Katharina and Ludwig see each other once more, passionately clinging to each other as they pass  in the basement of the prison where they are initially held.

In an epilogue, at Tötges's funeral, his editor delivers a hypocritical speech about how his murder was an attack on democracy and the freedom of the press. The film's final image is a block of text that appears over Tötges's funeral wreath and casket, linking the film's depiction of The Paper's yellow journalism to the practices of actual German tabloid Bild-Zeitung. This text also appears at the beginning of Heinrich Böll's book. It reads:

The characters and action in this story are purely fictitious. Should the description of certain journalistic practices result in a resemblance to the practices of Bild-Zeitung, such resemblance is neither intentional, nor fortuitous, but unavoidable.

Cast 
 Angela Winkler – Katharina Blum
 Mario Adorf – Kommissar Beizmenne (Inspector Beizmenne)
 Dieter Laser – Werner Tötges
 Jürgen Prochnow – Ludwig Götten
 Heinz Bennent – Dr. Hubert Blorna
 Hannelore Hoger – Trude Blorna
 Rolf Becker – Prosecutor Hach
 Harald Kuhlmann – Moeding 
 Herbert Fux – Weninger 
 Regine Lutz – Else Woltersheim 
 Werner Eichhorn – Konrad Beiters 
Karl Heinz Vosgerau – Alois Sträubleder
Angelika Hillbrecht – Frau Pletzer 
Horatius Häberle – Prosecutor Dr. Korten 
Henry van Lyck – 'Scheich' Karl
Stephanie Thönnessen – Claudia Sterm 
Peter Franke – Dr. Heinen

Analysis 
Produced during a time of political controversy in West Germany, and a time where journalists would stop at nothing to get their name known in the field, the film digs deep into human rights violations in what should be a peaceful, democratic country, and shines a light on the vindictive nature of the tabloid press and the tendency they have to spread lies and distort the facts. The film also presents a clear condemnation of collusion between the police and the yellow press. Unlike the novel, the film ends with a scene at Tötges' funeral, with his publisher delivering a hypocritical condemnation of the murder as an infringement on the freedom of the press.

The film establishes its concern with the media in its opening scene, which follows a man (Götten) who is being filmed and followed. Though she only spends one night with him, the police raid on Katharina's home, as well as her involvement with Götten, immediately becomes a media spectacle. When Katharina is released because the police can’t find the evidence to hold her, she walks into an abundance of journalists pointing cameras at her and yelling questions at her. She tries to look away, but the police officer escorting her out grabs a fistful of her hair and makes her look into the flashing lights and curious faces. He claims they’re just doing their jobs and that she needs to respect that.

The film represents the media as vindictive and scandal-obsessed. The Paper only publishes conspiracies and disregards the truth. The main reporter, Tötges, frequently makes up quotes and distorts facts to make Katharina's life fit a salacious narrative of a promiscuous woman who aids and abets anarchists and terrorists. It’s clear that the media doesn’t care if she is innocent or not. She is a story, and that is her only purpose to them. He makes up Katharina's mother's dying words to make a negative impression of her and to sell papers. He finds out that her grandfather emigrated to the USSR in 1932 and uses this as proof that Katharina holds similar views. In his final scene, he makes sexual advances on Katharina and actually expects her to be happy with him for "making her famous." The fact that he dragged her name through the mud does not register with him.

In interviews for the 2003 Criterion Collection DVD release of the film, Schlöndorff and other crew members argue for the film's continued relevance today, drawing an analogy between the political climate of panic over terrorism in 1970s West Germany and the post-September 11, 2001 situation in the U.S. where unsubstantiated media hype was used to launch the invasion of Iraq. Volker Schlondorff recounted that years later while he and Von Trotta were visiting Tashkent they noticed a theater where this movie was playing. They entered at the scene where the prosecutor and the police throw themselves onto the ground after hearing one of their own guns accidentally going off. The bureaucrats are the first to be scared of their own weapons. Schlondorff was happy that this message could be appreciated by people under the authoritarian government of Uzbekistan same as those under what was then West Germany.

Though the film ends with a journalist being shot, Volker Schlondorff considers this only a "metaphorical shooting" and that violence is against the message of Heinrich Boll.

Cinematography
This film has a documentary style and uses little lighting or special effects. The camera is largely stationary. The crane shot is used only once, in the final scene at Werner Tötges's funeral. Cinematographer Jost Vacano felt that this would make it easier to get into the heads of the audience. Volker Schlondorff originally went with another cinematographer but changed his mind later and went with Jost Vacano. The opening scene on the barge was shot with 16 mm film to make it seem like grainy camera footage. The film was shot during carnival season and uses many bright, vibrant colors but as the film progresses it becomes more dark and grayish to show Katharina's pain. Jost Vacano felt that this is one of his most important films, even more than American releases like Total Recall or Starship Troopers because of the political message and his cinematographic choices. The film has appeared on television thirty times since being released which according to Vacano shows that the message will always be relevant.

The film uses almost no makeup. Jost Vacano wanted you to see Katharina's skin imperfections and feel she was a real person.

Angela Winkler was said to have done her acting best on the first or second take while Mario Adorf was best on the seventh or eighth take. Multiple takes got him better into the character. Von Trotta also felt Winkler's emotion was a bit too juvenile in some takes and wasn't emotive enough.

The sets are intentionally abstract. Police offices are intentionally depicted as large open spaces with empty desks which was not the case in West Germany at the time. This abstract, empty set design was influenced by the American painter Allen Tucker.

Score
Hans Werner Henze chose Wagnerian themes for this movie. The opening scene is at the Rhine river and so Henze chose musical themes influenced by Das Rheingold. Henze called it "the poisoned river" because the dirty water was like the virus in society that was destroying German culture. The music is also a bit disjointed at parts to reflect this. Many of the different musical themes are brought together in a rondo at the end.

Historical context
Following the kidnapping and execution of a West German corporate leader, Hanns Martin Schleyer and several other prison deaths, The Lost Honour of Katharina Blum is a reflection of the conflicts in West Germany during the 1960s and 1970s, a time where student movements and a political struggle were occurring. Militant terrorists such as the Red Army Faction (the Baader-Meinhof Group) had holds in the government and it didn’t take long for their violent tendencies to make citizens questionable toward their governments as reforms began to turn into repressions. Some of these repressions resulted in brutal and destructive consequences, which the film blatantly opposes. Terrorism was confused with radicalism and fear was present in almost all citizens because of the political reforms and repressions the country had undergone.

This was a time period in which media coverage was expanding and journalism was becoming one of the biggest careers to have. Journalists were ruthless in their digging to come up with a story. Police were not afraid to become violent, whether it is emotional or physical. Witnesses and suspects seldom had a voice. Some of the topics the film explores are the vindictive nature of the media and police, as well as the abuse of power, discrimination, and emotional abuse. The Paper has no qualms with libel, slander or even just outright making up quotes to get the story they want.

References

Further reading 
 
 
 Gerhardt, Christina. "Surveillance Mechanisms in Literature and Film: Die verlorene Ehre der Katharina Blum by Böll and Schlöndorff / Von Trotta". Gegenwartsliteratur 7 (2008): 69-83.

External links 
 
 
Honoring Katharina: The Lost Honor of Katharina Blum an essay by Amy Taubin at the Criterion Collection
The Lost Honor of Katharina Blum essay by Scott McGee
film advertisement for West German television
The Lost Honor of Heinrich Böll documentary with Volker Schlöndorff and Margarethe von Trotta
 Hans Werner Henze: concerto suite of film music for "Katharina Blum" (1975)

1975 films
1970s political drama films
West German films
1970s German-language films
German political drama films
Films based on works by Heinrich Böll
Films directed by Volker Schlöndorff
Films directed by Margarethe von Trotta
Films based on German novels
Films about tabloid journalism
Films shot in Cologne
Films set in Cologne
Films set in West Germany
1975 drama films
Films about journalism
Films about journalists
Films about police misconduct
Films about bank robbery
Films about anarchism
1970s German films